{{Speciesbox
| taxon = Puntius tetraspilus
| display_parents = 3
| authority = (Günther, 1868)
| synonyms = 
 Barbus tetraspilus Günther, 1868 
 Leuciscus binotatus Blyth, 1858 
 Barbus innominatus Day, 1870 
 Neolissochilus innominatus (Day, 1870)
}}Puntius tetraspilus is a species of ray-finned fish in the genus Puntius'' from Sri Lanka.

References 

tetraspilus
Fish described in 1868
Taxa named by Albert Günther
Fish of Sri Lanka